"Secret Agent Man" is a song written by  P. F. Sloan and Steve Barri. The most famous recording of the song was made by Johnny Rivers for the opening titles of the American broadcast of the British spy series Danger Man, which aired in the U.S. as Secret Agent from 1964 to 1966. Rivers's version peaked at #3 on the Billboard Hot 100 and #4 on the Canadian RPM chart, one of the biggest hits of his career. Numerous covers and adaptations have been recorded since then with the song becoming both a rock standard and one of Johnny Rivers's signature songs.

History
According to composer P.F. Sloan, the American television network that licensed Danger Man, CBS, solicited publishers to contribute a 15-second piece of music for the opening of the U.S. show to replace the small section of the British theme, an instrumental by Edwin Astley entitled "High Wire", which started each episode. CBS executives were worried the show might not be successful without a "hummable" theme song. Sloan wrote the guitar lick and the first few lines of the song, with Barri (Sloan's songwriting partner) contributing to the chorus. This fragment was recorded as a demo by Sloan and Barri, submitted to CBS, and, to Sloan's surprise, picked as the show theme, which led to Sloan and Barri writing a full-length version of the song. The original demo of the song used the "Danger Man" title, as shown by the surviving demo of the song, which Sloan sang.   When the show's title was changed, the lyrics were also changed. The full version of "High Wire", which plays over the episode credits following the "Secret Agent" titles, was retained.

In 1965, surf rock band The Challengers recorded a version for their album The Man From U.N.C.L.E. that features vocal harmonies, horns, and vibraphone. This would be the first commercial release of the song, though it was never released as a single and consequently didn't garner much attention.

Sloan and Barri's publisher/producer, Lou Adler, also produced and managed Johnny Rivers, so Rivers was chosen to add the vocals for the TV show. Rivers claimed he came up with the opening guitar riff that was inspired by the "James Bond Theme", although the lick is clearly heard on Sloan's demo version. Chuck Day, the father of Cass Elliott's daughter, also claims to have come up with the opening of Secret Agent Man.  

Rivers's original recording was merely the show theme, with one verse and one chorus. Later, after the song gained in popularity, Rivers recorded it live, with two more verses, and the chorus repeated twice more. The live version was recorded in 1966 at the Whisky a Go Go, but not released until after a few studio production touch-ups were done by Adler shortly after. The song evokes secret agents both musically (making use of a memorable guitar riff) and through its lyrics (which describe the dangerous life of a secret agent). The lyric; "they've given you a number and taken away your name" referred to the numerical code names given to secret agents, as in "007" for James Bond, although it also acts as the (unintentional) setup to the "continuation" of Danger Man, the cult classic The Prisoner.

Chart

Personnel

Musicians
 Johnny Rivers – vocals, electric guitar
 Chuck Day – bass guitar, guitar
 Mickey Jones – drums
 Larry Knechtel – organ
 Joe Osborn – bass guitar, guitar

Technical
 Lou Adler – producer
 Bones Howe – engineer

Other versions

The Ventures

Surf rock band the Ventures did an instrumental version for their 1966 album, Play the Batman Theme, which featured a few instrumental covers of themes from spy series. Released as the band's first single of 1966, it went to #54 in the US and #82 in Canada, and was on the charts concurrently with the Rivers version.

Devo

In 1974, the song was recorded by Devo and again in 1979 on the Duty Now for the Future album with a jerky, heavily modified arrangement and significantly altered lyrics (sung by guitarist Bob Mothersbaugh). The 1974 recording was featured as a music video in Devo's independent short film, In The Beginning Was The End: The Truth About De-Evolution.

Bruce Willis

Bruce Willis recorded a version for his 1987 album The Return of Bruno which rose to #43 on the UK charts. Willis' version features introductory stock sounds and a new subtitle, "James Bond is Back".

Covers and adaptations

 Mel Tormé recorded a cover in 1966, the same year Rivers released the song, which appears on his album Right Now!
 Quebecois band Les Classels recorded a French-language version entitled "Agent de liaison" in 1966. It appears on their album Et Maintenant... of the same year.
 Finnish singer Danny recorded a Finnish-language version entitled "Vaaksa vaaraa vain," also in 1966, which appears on his record Se olla voi toisinkin päin of the same year.
 Jazz legend Art Blakey did an instrumental soul jazz take on "Secret Agent Man" for his 1967 album Hold On, I'm Coming.
 In 1978, Detroit-area punk-styled band Cinecyde recorded a version for their Black Vinyl Threat EP on Tremor Records, a recording later collected on their CD You Live a Lie You're Gonna Die.
 A Spanish version, "Hombre Secreto", recorded by The Plugz, is on the soundtrack to the film Repo Man (1984).
 Surf punk pioneers Agent Orange recorded a version for their 1984 When You Least Expect It EP. They released "Secret Agent Man" again in 1986 as a double A-side with "Shakin All Over."
 Blotto recorded a live version of the song in the mid-1980s, which was eventually released on their Then More Than Ever compilation album in 1999.
 Punk rockers The Pagans recorded at least three live versions over the years, which appear on their live albums Pirate's Cove 9/24/79 and Live Road Kill as well as on the B-side of the "Dead End America" 7".
 New York heavy metal band Hittman recorded the song on their self-titled album released on the German Steamhammer label, 1988.
 Hank Williams Jr. included a version originally recorded for his album Montana Cafe on the 1992 compilation The Bocephus Box.
 Finnish singer Tony Montana did his own version of "Vaaksa vaaraa vain" for his 1994 album Vaaksa vaaraa.
 Blues Traveler recorded a version of the song for the soundtrack of the 1995 film Ace Ventura: When Nature Calls.
 Vicious Delite included a cover on their self-titled and only record in 1995.
 The song was also recorded by The Toasters and included on the band's 1996 album Hard Band for Dead.
 The Dickies recorded a version for the 1997 album Show and Tell: A Stormy Remembrance of TV Theme Songs, a compilation of TV theme covers by various pop-punk artists.
 The band Psychotic Aztecs, composed of former members of The Plugz and Oingo Boingo, recorded a Spanish version as "Agente Secreto" on their 1998 album Santa Sangre.
 Japanese band Polysics did a version for their 1999 Plus Chicker EP.
 In 2000, a Japanese-language version was used as the theme-song for a TV drama called Heisei Meoto Jawan Dokechi no Hanamichi (Japanese:平成夫婦茶碗〜ドケチの花道〜). A one-off group called "Secret Agent", which included Noriyuki Higashiyama, Ryo Nishikido and others, was put together by Johnny's Juniors talent agency to record the song.
 Da Vinci's Notebook recorded a parody titled "Secret Asian Man" on their 2000 album The Life and Times of Mike Fanning.
 Heavy metal band Cirith Ungol included the song on their 2001 rare tracks compilation, Servants of Chaos.
 The song has been recorded by Rachael MacFarlane on her 2012 debut album, Hayley Sings.

See also
 Secret Asian Man

References

Television drama theme songs
1964 songs
1966 singles
Imperial Records singles
Warner Records singles
Motown singles
Song recordings produced by Lou Adler
Johnny Rivers songs
Devo songs
Songs about spies
Songs written by P. F. Sloan
Songs written by Steve Barri
Song recordings produced by Ken Scott
Songs written for films
Songs from animated series
James Bond parodies